Āshādh or Asār is the third month in the Bikram Samvat, the official Nepali calendar. This month coincides with June 15 to July 16 of the Western Calendar and is 31 or 32 days long. This month is known by Nepali farmers as the month of planting their fields. On the 15th of this month, it is also the day to eat curd chiura.

Months in Nepali calendar

See also
Vikram Samvat

Nepali calendar